P. pratensis may refer to:
 Poa pratensis, a perennial grass species
 Pratylenchus pratensis, a plant pathogenic nematode species
 Pulsatilla pratensis, a herbaceous perennial plant species
 Pupilla pratensis, a land snail species